Margaret Ralph ( – 6 March 1913) was a New Zealand landowner, businesswoman and matriarch. She was born in Strabane, County Tyrone, Ireland, in about 1822.

References

1822 births
1913 deaths
People from Strabane
New Zealand women in business
Irish emigrants to New Zealand (before 1923)
19th-century New Zealand businesspeople
19th-century New Zealand businesswomen